The Power of Sex is the second album by German Eurodance group E-Rotic. It was released in Europe in June 1996.

Track listings

Standard edition

 "Willy Use a Billy... Boy" – 3:41
 "Why" – 4:13
 "Help Me Dr. Dick" – 3:42
 "Ecstasy" – 3:59
 "The Power of Sex" – 3:35
 "Love And Sex Are Free" – 3:21
 "Talk to Your Girl" – 4:47
 "Fritz Love My Tits" – 4:08
 "Erotic Dreams" – 4:49
 "Tears in Your Blue Eyes" – 3:57
 "Gimme Good Sex" – 3:50
 "Angel's Night" – 3:54
 "Freedom" – 4:07
 "Willy Use a Billy ... Boy" (the house remix) – 6:02
 "Help Me Dr. Dick" (the first aid remix) – 5:54

Special edition

 "Help Me Dr. Dick" – 3:43
 "Willy Use a Billy... Boy" – 3:41
 "Why" – 4:13
 "Ecstasy" – 3:58
 "The Power of Sex" – 3:35
 "Love and Sex Are Free" – 3:21
 "Talk to Your Girl" – 4:47
 "Fritz Love My Tits" – 4:07
 "Erotic Dreams" – 4:48
 "Tears in Your Blue Eyes" – 3:57
 "Gimme Good Sex" – 3:50
 "Angel's Night" – 3:54
 "Freedom" – 4:06
 "Willy Use a Billy... Boy" (The House Remix) – 6:02
 "Help Me Dr. Dick" (The First Aid Remix) – 5:54
 "E-Rotic Megamix" – 4:03
 "Willy Use a Billy... Boy" (Without Sexy Heavy Breathing Voices) – 1:58
 "Help Me Dr. Dick" (Dr's Hospital Remix) – 5:04

Charts

Sales and certifications

References

External links

1996 albums
E-Rotic albums